Quaker Hill is a village or neighborhood in the town of Waterford, in the southeastern part of Connecticut, USA.

It is located in the northeast corner of the town, on the west bank of the Thames River (around Smith Cove) north of New London, and centered on the intersection of the Old Norwich Road and the Old Colchester Road.

The village center is included in the Quaker Hill Historic District, a historic district that is listed on the National Register of Historic Places. The historic district is the area around Old Norwich Road, extending as far south as the village of Thames View and as far north as Route 32.

Quaker Hill is the place name used for ZIP code 06375, which extends beyond Quaker Hill to encompass the entire northeastern portion of the town of Waterford, including Bartlett, Best View, Cohanzie, Harrisons and Thames View.

History
The area became known as Quaker Hill by 1687 due to its association with the Rogerenes or Rogerene Quakers, a religious sect founded by a local farmer, John Rogers (1648–1721) at the house near Benham Avenue.

The first house was built around 1740 by Benjamin Greene at Scotch Cap. The Robertson and Bingham paper mill, established in 1851, is said to be the first manufacturer of real tissue manila in the United States.

Education

Quaker Hill School
Waterford Public Schools operates one elementary school in Quaker Hill. The original Quaker Hill School was built in 1915, replacing two one- room district structures and was opened in 1917, and demolished on February 23, 2007, to make way for construction of a new Quaker Hill Elementary School that was scheduled to open in August 2008. This school is now located on 285 Bloomingdale Road, Quaker Hill CT.

Waterford Country School
Waterford Country School is a private nonprofit human services agency in Quaker Hill that offers a variety of special educational, residential treatment, and care services for children ages 10–18 from throughout eastern Connecticut. It was established in 1922 and moved to its current  site in Quaker Hill in 1929.

Famous Residents

 Eugene P. Wilkinson, Captain of the USS Nautilus, the world's first nuclear submarine, lived in Quaker Hill during the 1950s

Fire and EMS service
The Quaker Hill Fire Company serves the residents of Quaker hill. The Fire house is located on Old Colchester Road.

See also

 Connecticut College Arboretum
 New London, Connecticut
 Waterford, Connecticut

References

Waterford, Connecticut
Villages in Connecticut
Villages in New London County, Connecticut
Populated places on the Thames River (Connecticut)